Vaal Marina is a town in Midvaal in the Gauteng province of South Africa.

Vaal Marina is one of the three villages on the shoreline of the Vaal Dam, the other two being Deneysville and Oranjeville.

References

Populated places in the Midvaal Local Municipality